The mixed team compound competition at the 2022 European Archery Championships took place from 7 to 11 June in Munich, Germany.

Qualification round
Results after 144 arrows.

Elimination round

Source:

References

Mixed Team Compound